Non-invasive cerebellar stimulation is the application of non-invasive neurostimulation techniques on the cerebellum to modify its electrical activity. Techniques such as transcranial magnetic stimulation (TMS) or transcranial direct current stimulation (tDCS) can be used. The cerebellum is a high potential target for neuromodulation of neurological and psychiatric disorders due to the high density of neurons in its superficial layer, its electrical properties, and its participation in numerous closed-loop circuits involved in motor, cognitive, and emotional functions.

Cerebellar TMS is a relatively new field that is undergoing experimental research. There is not yet sufficient evidence of the therapeutic effects of cerebellar TMS, although some successful results have been reported in other clinical studies of TMS used to treat the frontal lobe.

See also
Deep brain stimulation
Transcranial alternating current stimulation (tACS)
Transcranial random noise stimulation (tRNS)

References

Neurostimulation
Cerebellum